Antonio Pio (1753 in Ravenna – 1795), was an Italian composer. He spent several years in St. Petersburg as music teacher at the Russian court, following Paisiello and Cimarosa. His oratorio Gionata was composed for a festival of the Virgin Mary in his home town in 1779.

References

1753 births
1795 deaths
Italian male classical composers
18th-century Italian composers
People from Ravenna
Italian expatriates in Russia
18th-century Italian male musicians